Cephaloziella is a genus of liverworts. Cephaloziella varians (Gottsche) Steph. is the only liverwort that occurs in the continental Antarctic.

Species 

 Cephaloziella acanthophora
 Cephaloziella aenigmatica
 Cephaloziella antillana
 Cephaloziella arctogena
 Cephaloziella arenaria
 Cephaloziella aspericaulis
 Cephaloziella aterrima
 Cephaloziella baumgartneri
 Cephaloziella biloba
 Cephaloziella biokoensis
 Cephaloziella breviperianthia
 Cephaloziella brinkmanii
 Cephaloziella calyculata
 Cephaloziella capensis
 Cephaloziella crassigyna
 Cephaloziella dentata
 Cephaloziella dentifolia
 Cephaloziella divaricata
 Cephaloziella dusenii
 Cephaloziella elachista
 Cephaloziella elegans
 Cephaloziella exigua
 Cephaloziella exiliflora
 Cephaloziella flexuosa
 Cephaloziella fragillima
 Cephaloziella gemmata
 Cephaloziella godajensis
 Cephaloziella gracillima
 Cephaloziella granatensis
 Cephaloziella grandiretis
 Cephaloziella grimsulana
 Cephaloziella grisea
 Cephaloziella hampeana
 Cephaloziella heteroica
 Cephaloziella hirta
 Cephaloziella indica
 Cephaloziella integerrima
 Cephaloziella invisa
 Cephaloziella kiaeri
 Cephaloziella longii
 Cephaloziella magna
 Cephaloziella mamillifera
 Cephaloziella massalongii
 Cephaloziella meghalayensis
 Cephaloziella microphylla
 Cephaloziella minima
 Cephaloziella minutifolia
 Cephaloziella muelleriana
 Cephaloziella natalensis
 Cephaloziella nothogena
 Cephaloziella obcordata
 Cephaloziella obliqua
 Cephaloziella obtusilobula
 Cephaloziella papillosa
 Cephaloziella parvifolia
 Cephaloziella patulifolia
 Cephaloziella pellucida
 Cephaloziella phyllacantha
 Cephaloziella polystratosa
 Cephaloziella pseudocrassigyna
 Cephaloziella pungens
 Cephaloziella rappii
 Cephaloziella recurvifolia
 Cephaloziella rhizantha
 Cephaloziella rubella
 Cephaloziella sinensis
 Cephaloziella spinicaulis
 Cephaloziella spinigera
 Cephaloziella spinophylla
 Cephaloziella squarrosula
 Cephaloziella starkei
 Cephaloziella stellulifera
 Cephaloziella stephanii
 Cephaloziella stolonifera
 Cephaloziella subdentata
 Cephaloziella subtilis
 Cephaloziella tenuissima
 Cephaloziella turneri
 Cephaloziella uncinata
 Cephaloziella varians
 Cephaloziella verrucosa
 Cephaloziella violacea
 Cephaloziella welwitschii
 Cephaloziella willisana

References

External links 
 
 
 
 Cephaloziella at Tropicos

Jungermanniales
Jungermanniales genera